The Parque de Bombas Maximiliano Merced, at 42 Muñoz Rivera Street in Aguas Buenas, Puerto Rico was built in 1955.  It was listed on the National Register of Historic Places in 2012.

It has also been known as Parque Maximiliano Merced and as Antiguo Parque de Bombas de Aguas Buenas.

References

Fire stations on the National Register of Historic Places in Puerto Rico
Art Deco architecture in Puerto Rico
Government buildings completed in 1955
Pumping stations
1955 establishments in Puerto Rico
Aguas Buenas, Puerto Rico